is a Japanese anime television series co-produced by the animation studios Bones and Orange. Licensed by Netflix and directed by Atsushi Takahashi, the series premiered on March 25, 2021 on Netflix in Japan, and on Tokyo MX and other channels on April 1 to June 24, 2021. The series is part of the Godzilla franchise and features monsters from its Shōwa era (1954–1975).

Plot 

The setting is Nigashio City, Chiba Prefecture in the year 2030. Engineer Yun Arikawa of the local "do-it-all" shop Otaki Factory investigates happenings in a Western-style house, long thought abandoned. Mei Kamino, a graduate student studying imaginary creatures, investigates mysterious signals received from Misakioku, the former Tsuguno district's administrative building. These two strangers, visiting completely different places as part of completely different investigations, both hear the same song. As they become united, they are led into a battle beyond imagination involving the whole world. Godzilla Singular Point features a brand new staff and original story which depicts the young geniuses as they take on this unprecedented threat to the universe with their companions.

Characters

Production
On October 6, 2020, Toho Animation and Netflix announced plans for an anime Godzilla series, titled Godzilla Singular Point, it aired from April 1 to June 24, 2021 on Tokyo MX and other channels. Production for the show is by Bones in partnership with Orange, blending hand-drawn and computer animation styles respectively. Atsushi Takahashi served as the director with scripts by Toh EnJoe, and music composed by Kan Sawada. Character design was handled by Blue Exorcist manga creator Kazue Kato, with former Studio Ghibli animator Eiji Yamamori designing the monsters. The series' opening theme, "in case...", is performed by BiSH, while Polkadot Stingray performed the ending theme song . There is also the recurring insert theme "ALAPU UPALA", performed by Indian-American singer Annette Philip, which is utilized in the storyline as a deus ex machina. The series debuted earlier on Netflix in Japan on March 25, 2021, which was followed by a global release on June 24, 2021.

Episode list

Marketing
First images and poster art were released on October 26, 2020 during Netflix's Anime Festival, with the streaming service releasing a teaser trailer later that same day. The teaser revealed that the series would air in April 2021 and would feature monsters and characters from the Shōwa era of the Godzilla franchise, such as Rodan, Anguirus, Jet Jaguar, Manda, and what initially appeared to be Titanosaurus and Gabara --the latter two later being revealed as new kaiju Godzilla Aquatilis and Salunga. On October 12, 2020, it was announced that Takahashi, EnJoe, Bones producer Naoki Amano, Orange producer Jiro Ando, and Toho producer Takashi Yoshizawa would all appear in a panel during the Godzilla Fest Online 2020 event on November 3, 2020. On February 12, 2021, the full design of Godzilla was revealed, illustrated by Eiji Yamamori and colored by Yūji Kaneko.

Godzilla Singular Point received a DVD/Blu-ray release in Japan in three separate volumes: the first volume was released on August 18, 2021, with the other two on September 22 and October 20. The show also received Bandai soft vinyl action figures as part of the Movie Monster series toyline. The first to be revealed was of Jet Jaguar and Godzilla in his Ultima form on March 6, 2021 in Japan. These two were later followed up by another vinyl figure of Godzilla in his Aquatilis form on April 17. Vinyl figures of Angurius and Manda were released on April 24. A vinyl figure of Godzilla in his Amphibia form to follow on May 15, and his Terrestris form one week later on May 22.

Reception

Critical reception

Accolades
Godzilla Singular Point won VFX-Japan Awards' 2022 "Excellence" and "Best" awards in the Television/Distribution Program Anime CG Category. It was also nominated for the 42nd Nihon SF Taisho Award. The anime series was awarded the 53rd Seiun Award in the Best Media category in 2022.

References

External links
  
 Godzilla Singular Point at the official Godzilla website by Toho Co., Ltd.
 
 
 

2021 anime television series debuts
Bones (studio)
Godzilla television series
Netflix original anime
Orange (animation studio)
Tokyo MX original programming
Action anime and manga
Science fiction anime and manga
Television series set in 2030
Television shows set in Kolkata
Television shows set in London
Toho Animation